Kenneth Murray Jr. (born November 16, 1998) is an American football linebacker for the Los Angeles Chargers of the National Football League (NFL). He played college football at Oklahoma and was drafted by the Chargers in the first round of the 2020 NFL Draft.

Early life

Murray attended Elkins High School in Missouri City, Texas. He committed to the University of Oklahoma to play college football.

College career
As a freshman at Oklahoma in 2017, Murray started all 14 games, recording 78 tackles and one sack and was named the co-Big 12 Defensive Freshman of the Year. He again started all 14 games his sophomore year in 2018, recording 155 tackles and 4.5 sacks.  Following a junior year where he was named to the First-team All-Big 12. Murray announced that he would forgo his senior season to declare for the 2020 NFL Draft.

Professional career

Murray was selected by the Los Angeles Chargers with the 23rd pick in the 2020 NFL Draft. The Chargers moved up from their second and third round selections in a trade with the New England Patriots to acquire the pick used to select Murray.

In Week 13 against the New England Patriots, Murray led the team with 14 tackles (12 solo) and recorded his first career sack on Cam Newton during the 45–0 loss.

On October 4, 2021, Murray was placed on injured reserve after suffering an ankle injury in practice. He was activated on November 13.

References

External links
Oklahoma Sooners bio

1998 births
Living people
People from Missouri City, Texas
Players of American football from Texas
Sportspeople from Harris County, Texas
American football linebackers
Oklahoma Sooners football players
Los Angeles Chargers players